The Clinton–Washington Avenues station is a station on the IND Crosstown Line of the New York City Subway. Located at Lafayette Avenue between Clinton and Washington Avenues in Clinton Hill, Brooklyn, it is served by the G train at all times.

History 
This station opened on July 1, 1937, when the entire Crosstown Line was completed between Nassau Avenue and its connection to the IND Culver Line. On this date, the GG was extended in both directions to Smith–Ninth Streets and Forest Hills–71st Avenue.

Station layout

This underground station has two tracks and two side platforms. Both platforms have a light green trim line with a dark green border and mosaic name tablets reading "CLINTON - WASHINGTON AV." on two lines in white sans-serif lettering on a dark green background and a lighter green border. Beneath the trim line and name tablets are small tile directional signs and station names (alternating between "CLINTON" and "WASHINGTON") in white lettering on a black background. Hunter green (previously yellow) I-beam columns run along both platforms at regular intervals, alternating ones having the standard black station name plate in white lettering.

The mezzanine has five murals of artwork, each of different names and artists. They are Night and Day by Jim Porter installed in 1998, Safe Passage by Dan Simmons, an untitled artwork by Maku, Fusion by Jamal Ince installed in 2000, and Mercury by John Woodrow Kelley installed in 2000.

Exits
This station has a full length mezzanine above the platforms and tracks supported by yellow I-beam columns. The center of the mezzanine is outside fare control and has a token booth and two street stairs at each end. The ones on the west (railroad south) go up to the northeast and southwest corners of Clinton and Lafayette Avenues while the ones on the east (railroad north) end go up to either eastern corners of Washington and Lafayette Avenues. The center of the mezzanine also has a bank of turnstiles, two exit-only turnstiles, and two staircases going down to each platform.

At either end of the mezzanine are unstaffed entrances/exits containing two exit-only turnstiles, one high entry/exit turnstile, and one staircase to each platform. Both of these fare control areas have a crossover that allow a free transfer between directions. A short staircase is required to reach the center mezzanine from the Clinton Avenue fare control area due to a higher ceiling.

Nearby points of interest
 Pratt Institute
 Adelphi University
 Saint Joseph College
 Bishop Loughlin High School

References

External links 

 
 Station Reporter — G Train
 The Subway Nut — Clinton–Washington Avenues Pictures 
 Clinton Avenue entrance from Google Maps Street View
 Washington Avenue entrance from Google Maps Street View
 Platforms from Google Maps Street View

IND Crosstown Line stations
New York City Subway stations in Brooklyn
Railway stations in the United States opened in 1937
1937 establishments in New York City
Clinton Hill, Brooklyn